Thomas Henry Foorde Russell Buckworth Royse, MC was Archdeacon of Cloyne  from 1951 until 1957.

Royse was educated at Trinity College, Dublin and ordained in 1906.  After  curacies at Kilbrogan and Cork he was a Chaplain to the Forces during World War I. He was the incumbent at Garrycloyne from 1919; and Chancellor of Saint Fin Barre's Cathedral from 1947.

References

Alumni of Trinity College Dublin
Recipients of the Military Cross
Archdeacons of Cloyne